Alfred Savill (1829–1905) was the founder of Savills, one of the United Kingdom's largest estate agents.

Career
Born in Chigwell, Essex, Alfred Savill became a land agent, surveyor and auctioneer. He opened the first office of Savills in the City of London in 1855.

He commissioned the building of Chigwell Hall in 1876. He was a supporter of various charitable causes giving land away to allow the construction of a chapel at Squirrels Heath near Hornchurch in 1884. He died in 1905.

Family
Savill's practice, then known as Alfred Savill & Sons, continued to be managed by his sons and later became Savills, one of the country's largest estate agents. His grandson Sir Eric Savill, also a chartered surveyor, worked for the Crown Estate as manager of Windsor Great Park and was the creator of Savill Garden located within the park.

References

1829 births
1905 deaths
People from Chigwell
19th-century English businesspeople